Pedro Vaca (born 22 April 1961) is a Bolivian former cyclist. He competed in two events at the 1992 Summer Olympics.

References

1961 births
Living people
Bolivian male cyclists
Olympic cyclists of Bolivia
Cyclists at the 1992 Summer Olympics
Place of birth missing (living people)